Australia has well over 300 surf lifesaving clubs. The following is a partial list of Australian surf lifesaving clubs.

Bondi Surf Bathers' Life Saving Club
Bronte Surf Lifesaving Club
Cabarita Beach Surf Life Saving Club
Clovelly Surf Life Saving Club
Coogee Surf Life Saving Club
Cronulla Surf Life Saving Club
Darwin Surf Life Saving Club
Dee Why Surf Lifesaving Club 
Elouera Surf Life Saving Club
Freshwater Surf Life Saving Club
Ithaca–Caloundra City Life Saving Club
Southport Surf Lifesaving Club QLD
Manly Life Saving Club
Maroubra Surf Life Saving Club
North Bondi Surf Life Saving Club
North Styne Surf Lifesaving Club
Palm Beach Surf Life Saving Club
Redhead Surf Lifesaving Club
South Curl Curl Surf Lifesaving Club
South Maroubra Surf Life Saving Club
South Port SLSC SA
Tamarama Surf Life Saving Club
Wanda Surf Life Saving Club

See also

List of swim clubs
Surf lifesaving
Surf Life Saving Australia

References

External links
 

 
Australia
Lifesaving